Hovig is a given name and a surname. It may refer to:

Given name
Hovig Demirjian or just Hovig, Armenian Cypriot singer to represent Cyprus in Eurovision Song Contest 2017

Middle name
John Hovig Dolmayan, Lebanese-born Armenian–American songwriter and musician, best known as the drummer of System of a Down.

Surname
Andrea Bræin Hovig (born 1973), Norwegian actress
Geir Hovig (1944–2009), Norwegian radio host
Ingrid Espelid Hovig (1924–2018), Norwegian television chef and author of cook books
Jan Inge Hovig (1920–1977), Norwegian architect
Ole Torstein Hovig, member of the Norwegian pop-rock band Ludvig Moon 
Torstein Hovig (1928–2015), Norwegian pathologist

See also
Hovik (disambiguation)

Norwegian-language surnames